Lena Ingeborg Hallengren (born 25 December 1973) is a Swedish politician of the Social Democratic Party who has been served as Minister for Health and Social Affairs in the cabinet of Prime Minister Stefan Löfven from 21 January 2019 until he left office in November 2021.  Hallengren then continued in the same role in the Andersson Cabinet.

Political career
In the government of Prime Minister Göran Persson, Hallengren served as Deputy Minister of Education, in charge of preschool education, youth affairs and adult learning, from 2002 to 2006.

Hallengren has been a member of the Riksdag since the 2006 elections. In that capacity, she served as member of the Member of the Committee on Environment and Agriculture (2006-2009) and later chaired the Committee on Transport and Communications (2009-2010) and the Committee on Education (2014–2018).

In March 2018, Hallengren became Minister for Children, the Elderly and Equality after her predecessor Åsa Regnér left the government for a post in the United Nations. This was an office at the Ministry of Health and Social Affairs in the first Löfven Cabinet. At the formation of the second cabinet under prime minister Stefan Löfven in January 2019, Hallengren was promoted to head of the same ministry. In September 2022, Hallengren was elected as leader for the Social Democrats in the Riksdag. Subsequently, she resigned in October 2022 from her office as Minister for Health and Social Affairs.

Since 2020, Hallengren has also been a member of the Global Leaders Group on Antimicrobial Resistance, co-chaired by Sheikh Hasina and Mia Mottley.

Other activities
 Global Partnership to End Violence Against Children, Member of the Board (since 2018)

 Participant at Bilderberg meeting in Washington D.C., 2 June - 5 June 2022

References

External links
Lena Hallengren at the Riksdag website
Lena Hallengren at the website of the Swedish government

|-

|-

|-

|-

|-

|-

|-

|-

|-

|-

Living people
1973 births
People from Kalmar
Women members of the Riksdag
Swedish Ministers for Gender Equality
Swedish Ministers for Health
Swedish Ministers for Social Affairs
Women government ministers of Sweden
Members of the Riksdag from the Social Democrats
Members of the Riksdag 2006–2010
Members of the Riksdag 2010–2014
Members of the Riksdag 2014–2018
Members of the Riksdag 2018–2022
Members of the Riksdag 2022–2026
21st-century Swedish politicians
21st-century Swedish women politicians